From 1793 to 1795 only, Massachusetts elected one of its fourteen representatives to the United States House of Representatives statewide at-large.  He was David Cobb.

Other than that single 2-year period, Massachusetts has never elected a member of the U.S. House of Representatives at-large.

Sole member

References

 Congressional Biographical Directory of the United States 1774–present
 

At-large
Former congressional districts of the United States
At-large United States congressional districts
Constituencies established in 1793
Constituencies disestablished in 1795
1793 establishments in Massachusetts
1795 disestablishments in Massachusetts